Lycée Franco-Hondurien (LFH) is a French international school in Tegucigalpa, Honduras. It serves levels maternelle (preschool) through lycée (senior high school).

It was created in 1966.

See also

References

External links
  Lycée Franco-Hondurien
  Lycée Franco-Hondurien

International schools in Honduras
Schools in Tegucigalpa
Tegucigalpa
Educational institutions established in 1966
1966 establishments in the United States